Peter Joseph Donohue (November 5, 1900 – February 23, 1988) was a right-handed starting pitcher with a 12-year career from 1921 to 1932.  He played for the Cincinnati Reds, New York Giants, both of the National League, and the Cleveland Indians and Boston Red Sox of the American League. His interment was located at Fort Worth's Greenwood Memorial Park along with Tom Baker and Jackie Tavener.

During a start on June 12, 1928, Donohue pitched  innings and allowed 11 earned runs on 14 hits. However, thanks in part to his own home run, he was credited with the win. , his game score of 1 is the lowest for a winning pitcher since the earned run became an official statistic in 1913.

Donohue was a very good hitting pitcher in his major league career, posting a .246 batting average (180-for-732) with 44 runs, 6 home runs, 87 RBI and drawing 21 bases on balls.

Highlights
Led National League in wins (1926, with 20 wins)

See also
List of Major League Baseball annual wins leaders

References

External links

1900 births
1988 deaths
Boston Red Sox players
Cincinnati Reds players
Cleveland Indians players
New York Giants (NL) players
Major League Baseball pitchers
National League wins champions
Baseball players from Texas
Kansas City Blues (baseball) players
Jersey City Skeeters players
Minneapolis Millers (baseball) players
Columbus Red Birds players
Hollywood Stars players
TCU Horned Frogs baseball players
People from Athens, Texas